Mariapaola D’Imperio is an Italian linguist and Distinguished Professor at the Department of Linguistics at Rutgers University. She is president of the Association for Laboratory Phonology and is known for her works on phonology.
Previously D'Imperio was a professor at Aix-Marseille University and head of the Prosody Group at the Laboratoire Parole et Langage (CNRS). She is an associate editor of the Journal of Phonetics since 2016.

References

Phonologists
Living people
Year of birth missing (living people)
Ohio State University alumni
Linguists from Italy
Rutgers University faculty
Academic staff of Aix-Marseille University
University of Naples Federico II alumni